J.J. or JJ Lee may refer to:

John Joseph Lee, Irish historian
JJ Lee, Canadian writer and journalist